Wellington College, is a state-run boys secondary school in Wellington, New Zealand. It is situated on 12 hectares of green belt land in the suburb of Mount Victoria, in the vicinity of the Basin Reserve and Government House. The school was founded in 1876 through a deed of endowment from Sir George Grey, the then Governor of New Zealand.

Wellington College is one of the oldest boys' secondary schools in New Zealand. The history and influence of Wellington College have made it notable in the history of New Zealand, with prominent alumni such as Arthur Coningham, Bernard Freyberg and William Pickering. The school is known nationally for both its academic success, as well as a large number of sporting activities.

The school has an enrolment of about 1750 boys. Glen Denham is the current Headmaster.

History 

Wellington College opened in 1867 as Wellington Grammar School in Woodward Street, though Sir George Grey gave the school a deed of endowment in 1853.  In 1869 the school moved to a new, spired, wooden building  on the hills above the central city in Clifton Terrace from where it could be seen from many places in Wellington. In 1874 the college opened in a much larger building at its present location. The former boarding establishment at the College, Firth House, was named after Joseph Firth, the headmaster from 1892 to 1921. 

Wellington College's Pavilion, Firth House and the Gifford Observatory were opened on 1 December, 1924. The War Memorial Hall was opened on 2 March, 1928, financially supported by £6000 from the Old Boys' Association. The War Memorial Hall and classroom wings were demolished by the Ministry of Works and replaced in the 1960s with a new hall and seven-storey Tower classroom block due to its lack of earthquake reinforcements. The stained glass window from the front of the War Memorial Hall is now located in the front of the existing hall.

In the 1960s the Old Boys Gymnasium was built on the eastern boundary of the campus replacing the swimming pool and during the 1970s the Maths, Library and Technology blocks were opened, replacing the last of the War Memorial Hall building and classroom wings that opened in 1928.

In 1980 Firth House was demolished to make way for a new gymnasium which opened in 1982. 1988 saw the opening of the Arts and Music block, and the Brierley Theatre, named after old boy Ron Brierley.

The first dedicated computer rooms in the College opened in 1994 in a new building located behind the school hall.

2001 saw the opening of the Science block, on the western boundary of the campus. In 2008 the Languages block opened, also located on the western boundary.

The campus also has many prefabricated buildings, some functioning as offices and some as classrooms.

The only "historical" buildings remaining on campus to this day are Firth Hall, the Pavilion and the Gifford Observatory.

In 2016, the College Hall was demolished to make way for a larger Assembly Hall and Performing Arts Centre, which would be able to hold the entire school with its growing population. In preparation for this, the staffroom was moved to Firth Hall, the Uniform Shop opened a new premise next to the Archives, and the Computer Block was opened on the first floor of Tower Block. Construction on the new hall commenced in September 2016 and was opened in 2018 by Jacinda Ardern.

About
Wellington College's enrolment zone mainly covers the central and western suburbs of Wellington (Rongotai College serves the southeastern suburbs, and Onslow College the northern suburbs).

The school also competes in a local athletics competition known as "McEvedy Shield" along with St. Patrick's College (Town), St. Patrick's College (Silverstream) and Rongotai College. Historically, Wellington College have won the shield more than any other school.

It is next to Wellington East Girls' College, also in Mount Victoria, and shares with that college the Gifford Observatory. Although Wellington College is situated next to Wellington East Girls' College, its sister college is Wellington Girls' College located in Thorndon.

In 2011, 2012 and 2013, Wellington College earned the highest number of scholarships in the New Zealand scholarship exams.

Board of Trustees 
The Wellington College Board of Trustees consists of twelve elected and appointed members.

Notable alumni

The Arts 
 Maxwell Fernie – organist, conductor and music teacher
 Alexander Grant – ballet dancer, teacher, and company director 
 Jonathan Harlen – author
 Dai Henwood – comedian
 Raybon Kan – writer and comedian
 Bret McKenzie – Academy Award-winning songwriter and member of Flight of the Conchords 
 John Mulgan – editor, writer, journalist and Army officer
 Robert J. Pope  – songwriter, poet, cricketer
 Karl Urban – actor

Broadcasting & journalism 
 Edward George Honey – Australian journalist credited by some as the originator of the Two-minute silence tradition
 John Campbell – journalist, radio and television personality
 Keith Quinn – TV and radio sports presenter
 Chris Spence – journalist
 Bryan Waddle – cricket commentator & radio presenter

Business 
 Ron Brierley – businessman 
 Alan Gibbs – businessman
 Arthur Myers – businessman and politician 
 Steve Outtrim – businessman
 Frank Renouf – businessman

Public service 
 Henry Avery, New Zealand's Quartermaster General during World War Two and former All Black
 Grafton Francis Bothamley – Clerk of the New Zealand House of Representatives
 Arthur Coningham – World War II commander and World War I Air Ace. Portrayed in the film Patton 
 Ken Douglas, trade union leader and politician 
 Bernard Freyberg, Governor-General, World War I VC Winner and World War II commander
 Thomas Gault – Justice of the Supreme Court of New Zealand
 William Gentry - World War II commander
 Lord Grey of Naunton – last Governor of Northern Ireland
 Frederick Hanson, World War II commander, subsequently Commissioner of Works at the Ministry of Works 
 Michael Hardie Boys – former Governor-General of New Zealand
 Thomas Hislop – Mayor of Wellington from 1931 to 1945
 Don Hunn CNZM – senior New Zealand diplomat, civil servant, and State Services Commissioner
 Ngātata Love – academic and Treaty negotiator
 Rex Mason – politician
 Matthew Oram – lawyer, politician, Speaker of Parliament
 Graham Beresford Parkinson – World War II commander
 Paul Reeves – former Governor-General of New Zealand
 Adrian G. Rodda – senior civil servant and Chairman of the State Services Commission
 Eric Roussell – Clerk of the New Zealand House of Representatives
 William Ball Sutch, New Zealand public servant, put on trial for espionage
 Ray Wallace,  Mayor of Lower Hutt from 2010 to 2019

Science 
 George Leslie Adkin – farmer, geologist, ethnologist, photographer, and environmentalist. 
 David Benney – emeritus professor and former head of the Department of Mathematics at MIT
 Ian Foster – computer scientist
 Diamond Jenness - anthropologist in Canada
 William Pickering – former Head of the NASA Jet Propulsion Laboratory (space scientist)
 Philip Robertson – chemist, university professor and writer
 Jonathan Sarfati – creationist, scientist, and New Zealand Chess Champion

Sport 
 Nelson Asofa-Solomona – rugby league player for Melbourne Storm
 Tom Blundell – professional cricketer for the Wellington Firebirds and New Zealand Black Caps
 Leo Bertos – former professional football player for the Wellington Phoenix and the All Whites
 Harry Boam – cricketer for the Wellington Firebirds
 Craig Bradshaw – Former Professional Basketballer, and member of New Zealand Tall Blacks
 George Bridgewater – New Zealand rower
 Tim Brown – former professional footballer for the Wellington Phoenix and the All Whites. Also co-founder of Allbirds
 Ralph Caulton – All Black
 Dane Coles – All Black
 Ross Durant – football player for New Zealand All Whites
 Simon Elliott – former football player with the San Jose Earthquakes and New Zealand All Whites
 Marc Ellis – former All Black, entertainer, businessman 
 James Franklin – cricketer, plays for Black Caps and Wellington Firebirds
 Wes Goosen - Rugby Union player for 
 Ken Gray – All Black
 Onny Parun – tennis player
 Dion Prewster – Professional Basketballer, and member of New Zealand Tall Blacks.
 Lima Sopoaga – All Black
 Peter Taylor – New Zealand rower
 Neemia Tialata – All Black 
 Filo Tiatia – All Black
 Ian Uttley – All Black
 Phillip Wilson – Olympic gold medallist rower

Headmasters

Coat of Arms

References

External links

 Official website
 NZQA examination results
 Wellington College and the First World War (from the Ministry of Culture and Heritage)

Boys' schools in New Zealand
Educational institutions established in 1867
Secondary schools in the Wellington Region
Schools in Wellington City
Cricket grounds in New Zealand
1867 establishments in New Zealand